Doniphan West USD 111 is a public unified school district headquartered in Denton, Kansas, United States.  The district includes the communities of Denton, Bendena, Highland, Leona, Severance, White Cloud, and nearby rural areas of Doniphan County.

Schools
The school district operates the following schools:
 Doniphan West Junior-Senior High School.
 Highland Elementary School.

History
In 2009, Midway-Denton USD 433 consolidated with Highland USD 425 to form Doniphan West USD 111.

The Midway USD 433 school colors were Red, White and Blue and the mascot was the Eagle.

Previously the middle school was near Denton and the high school was in Highland.

See also
 Kansas State Department of Education
 Kansas State High School Activities Association
 List of high schools in Kansas
 List of unified school districts in Kansas

References

External links
 

School districts in Kansas
Education in Doniphan County, Kansas
School districts established in 2009
2009 establishments in Kansas